Sam Washington (born 2 August 1979) is an English director and writer of films and commercials.

His work has been awarded by international organizations and juries, including Cannes Lions, The Webby Awards, London International Awards and Palm Springs International Festival of Short Films.

His most acclaimed works include the ‘Ricky’ advertising campaign for Australian telecommunications brand Optus, featuring British comedian Ricky Gervais and the film Lab Rats.

Career

Washington started his career at the age of sixteen and held various positions within the television and film industries before making his commercial directorial debut in 2001 with a series of animated commercials for Sky Television entitled ‘Toon Town’.

In 2003, Washington took a break from commercials to work on the launch of the rock music channel Scuzz. Then in 2005, after a brief return to directing, took a position as a copywriter at London advertising agency Brothers & Sisters, working predominantly on the Sky Sports account.

When Washington returned to directing in 2007, it was for sports brands such as adidas, Foot Locker and Sky Sports, working with athletes like Lionel Messi, and Cesc Fàbregas.

Washington's commercial for Yorkshire Tea marked a move away from sports and into more mainstream advertising, going on to direct commercials for Chevrolet, Tesco, BSkyB, Sky Italia and Vax.

In 2009, Washington directed and produced the short film Lab Rats, written by Louis Rosenberg, which went on to win multiple awards including Best Short Film at Moondance International Film Festival and Best Foreign Short at L.A. Comedy Shorts Film Festival. Lab Rats was later re-edited into a six-part web series, which won the Best Web Series award at the Los Angeles Web Series Festival and was licensed by Frostbite Pictures for distribution.

In 2011, Washington directed the short film Lost & Found as part of the Smoke & Mirrors 48 Hour Film Festival, for which he won Best Film. Lost & Found went on to win the Online Audience Choice Award at the Palm Springs International Festival of Short Films.

In 2013, Washington appeared on Naomi Campbell’s model-search reality TV show, The Face, directing a commercial for luxury car brand Maserati which featured the show’s contestants.

In 2015, Washington directed a series of commercials for Australian telecommunications brand Optus, featuring British comedian Ricky Gervais. The campaign received wide critical acclaim including a Cyber award at the Cannes Lions International Festival of Creativity and was featured on The Ellen DeGeneres Show. The campaign broke the Facebook record for the fastest branded video to reach 4 million views in Australia.

Awards

References

Living people
1979 births
English film directors
English screenwriters
English male screenwriters